César Muñiz Fernández (born 18 May 1970, in Anderlecht, Brussels) is a Belgian-born Spaniard retired association football referee who operates in the top league of Spanish football, La Liga. He has been a FIFA-listed referee since 2007.

References

1970 births
Spanish football referees
Living people
People from Anderlecht
Sportspeople from Asturias
Sportspeople from Brussels